Manoug Manougian is an Armenian scientist, professor, and considered the father of the Lebanese space program. Manougian was born on April 29, 1935 in Jerusalem. He came to the United States in 1956. His parents are Nishan and Sirpouhi Manougian.

Personal life and education 
Manougian grew up in Jerusalem and was educated at St. George's School, Jerusalem.
Manougian won a scholarship to the University of Texas, and he graduated in 1960 with a major in math. Right away, Haigazian College in Beirut was glad to offer him a job teaching both math and physics. The college also made him the faculty advisor for the science club.
Manougian met his wife in Armenia circa 1955 when he became her tutor. They eloped shortly after to the United States. While his wife attended school in Ohio, Manougian attended the University of Texas (see above). After graduating, they moved to Beirut.

Career 
Manougian married in 1960 and went to Lebanon to become a teacher at Haigazian College.

Lebanese Space Program 
He founded the Haigazian College Rocket Society in November 1960. With a very limited budget, the society launched a series of rockets to increasing altitudes.  It received funding from the Lebanese government and became the Lebanese Rocket Society.  He and his students finally launched a suborbital rocket in 1963. The Cedar IV rocket, launched on Lebanese independence day, 21 November 1963 from Dbayeh north of Beirut, reached  and was featured on Lebanese stamps.

Teaching 
He returned to the United States in 1966.  Manougian completed a master's degree and doctorate at the University of Texas and continued his academic career in the Department of Mathematics at the University of South Florida. He is currently still a professor in the Department of Mathematics at the University. He also acts as an adviser for the University's Society of Aeronautics and Rocketry which is currently trying to launch to rocket above the kármán line.

Views and politics 
As a member of the Armenian diaspora, he has been known to write editorials advocating awareness about the Armenian genocide. He is also a co-author and associate producer of a 4-hour documentary called The Genocide Factor: The Human Tragedy, that aired on PBS.  In addition, he vehemently believes that rocketry and science should be pursued for solely peaceful means. Consequentially, he turned down multiple lucrative offers during his time in the Lebanese Rocket Society rather than let his work be used for military purposes.

References

External Links 
The Lebanese Rocket Society, The Daily Telegraph, October 9, 2013
It is rocket science: USF students build and launch 'em The Tampa Tribune, December 21, 2013

Lebanese scientists
People from Jericho Governorate
University of Texas alumni
University of Texas faculty
Academic staff of Haigazian University
Rocket scientists
American people of Armenian descent
Lebanese people of Armenian descent
Palestinian people of Armenian descent
1936 births
Living people